Josiah Hamilton Langdon Tuck (October 12, 1824 – October 14, 1900) was an American inventor and pioneering submarine designer.

In addition to his submarine work, Tuck was granted several other patents.

Peacemaker 

Tuck was granted  for a "submarine vessel" in 1884. His submarine prototype, the Peacemaker, was tested with mixed success in 1884, 1885 and 1886 in New York's harbor. In its final form, it was powered by a chemical reaction based on caustic soda and it was armed with electrically fused buoyant "torpedoes", explosive charges that were intended to be planted under enemy ships.

In 1888, the US government announced a competition for submarine designs. Tuck submitted his design along with a number of other inventors, including John Philip Holland, Thorsten Nordenfelt and George C. Baker. Holland won the competition, but due to irregularities the contract was not awarded.

References

External links 
 
 The Peacemaker Submarine

19th-century American inventors
Submarine pioneers
1824 births
1900 deaths